Ennodishtam Koodamo is a 1992 Indian Malayalam-language romantic comedy film directed by Kamal, written by Raghunath Paleri and produced by Mudra Sasi. It stars Mukesh, Madhoo, Siddique, J. D. Chakravarthy and Janardhanan.

The film marks the acting debut of Dileep who played a small role and the Malayalam film debut of J. D. Chakravarthy. Dileep and Lal Jose served as assistant directors to Kamal.

Plot 

This movie is a campus love story, where the daughter of a policeman and a poor guy fall in love. However, her family want her to marry a policeman. Although the job of policemen is to protect the law, they start breaking the law using all sorts of violence and violating her right to marriage by corruption.

Cast 
Mukesh as Ramanunni
Madhoo as Arathi Menon / Bobby
Siddique as City Police Commissioner Jinachandran IPS
Mavelikkara Ponnamma as Arathi's Grandmother
J. D. Chakravarthy as Renjith Lal
Janardhanan as Circle Inspector / Arathi's Uncle
K.P.A.C. Sunny as Arathi's Uncle 
Sathaar as ASP / Arathi's uncle 
Krishnankutty Nair as Veeran Nair
KPAC Lalitha as Ramanunni's sister
Zainuddin as Sundaran
Kalpana as Bhagyalakshmi
Idavela Babu as Ramanunni's Friend
Innocent as Dr. Kuttan
M. G. Soman as Arathi's father
Unnimary
Vettukili Prakash as Vettukili
Alummoodan as Kunjikkuttan / Principal
Dileep as Dileep Renjith lal's friend
Kunchan as Krishnankutty
Kanakalatha
Jagathy Sreekumar in a photo

Soundtrack 
The film had musical score composed by S. P. Venkatesh.

Puthuvarna Vasantham : K. J. Yesudas, Sujatha
Hey Nilakkili : S. Janaki

References

External links
 

1990s Malayalam-language films
1992 films
1992 romantic comedy films
Indian romantic comedy films
Films scored by Ouseppachan
Films scored by S. P. Venkatesh
Films directed by Kamal (director)